Exhi (foaled 2007) was sired by Maria's Mon, and his dam was the Group 2-placed stakes winner Soldera (Polish Numbers).  He is a homebred for Wertheimer et Frère and trained by Todd Pletcher.

Exhi broke his maiden on turf at Belmont Park, in his third career start of his two-year-old season.

In his three-year-old season he made a splash giving his trainer his third straight Lexington Stakes on April 17. In his prior start, Exhi gave Pin Oak sires a 1-2 finish in the $100,000 Rushaway Stakes, when he (by Maria's Mon) stubbornly held off Lonesome Street (by Broken Vow) on March 27 at Turfway Park.

To date, Exhi's total earnings are $284,198 and he has been in the money 6 of 8 starts.

External links
 Exhi's pedigree & stats

2007 racehorse births
Racehorses trained in the United States
Racehorses bred in Kentucky
Thoroughbred family 4-g